George William Bignell  (July 18, 1858 – January 16, 1925) was a Major League Baseball player. He played four games for the Milwaukee Brewers of the Union Association in 1884.

Sources

Major League Baseball catchers
Milwaukee Brewers (UA) players
19th-century baseball players
Baseball players from Massachusetts
Duluth Jayhawks players
Milwaukee Brewers (minor league) players
Bay City (minor league baseball) players
Brockton (minor league baseball) players
1858 births
1925 deaths